PCER can refer to:
 Per-comparison error rate, a concept used in statistics
 Partija za Celosna Emancipacija na Romite, a Macedonian political party
 PCER, a type of patrol vessel of the United States Navy, derived from "Patrol Craft Escort (Rescue)"